The Schauinsland (literally "look-into-the-country"; near Freiburg im Breisgau, Germany) is a mountain in the Black Forest with an elevation of  above sea level. It is a popular destination for day trips. Due to the high amount of silver mining, it was previously known as "Erzkasten" (literally "ore box"); the name "Schouwesland" first appeared in 1347.

Geography 

The summit of the Schauinsland is located in the district of Freiburg. The mountain is surrounded by towns such as Oberried, Munstertal, Bollschweil, and Horben (clockwise). The closest village to the summit is Hofsgrund. In Autumn especially, during a temperature inversion, there is a clear view of the Vosges mountains from the top of the Schauinsland. Under appropriate weather conditions there is a view of a large portion of the Swiss Alps.

Since 2003, the Holzschlägermatte on the Schauinsland has been home to a number of very controversial wind turbines. Therefore, the view to and from the summit is only slightly restricted. During the lawsuit against the operating company, the Freiburg-based artist Richard Schindler wrote an expert report which is considered the first of its kind.

History

Mining 

For over 700 years, silver, lead and zinc were mined from the Schauinsland. In the Middle Ages, mining was very productive, so much so that in the 14th century a number of contractors of the Dieselmuot mine could afford to donate glass windows to the Freiburg Minster. The miners lived right next to the mines on the Schauinsland in two settlements, which were abandoned during the 16th century. The silver obtained was traded and used for minting coins. At the beginning of the 20th century, about 250 miners were employed in the Schauinsland mines. Production ceased in 1954 due to the mine not yielding enough economy.

Kapplerstollen 

There is a tunnel, the so-called Kapplerstollen, which connects the villages Kappel and Hofsgrund. It is also referred to as "midwife's tunnel" due to the fact that around the end of the 19th century midwives, as well as the children of Kappel, used it as a shortcut to Hofsgrund.

The tunnel still exists, however, its entries are no longer accessible.

Since 1975, the Barbarastollen, a reconstructed part of the mine, has been used by the Federal Office for Civil Protection and Emergency Aid as a storage facility for Germany's archived materials. The tunnel is Europe's largest long-term archive.

Mining museum 

The research team Steiber, founded in 1976, cleared and surveyed several old parts of the mine. A part of an old ore mine has been transformed into a museum that has been open to the public since 1997. On tours, visitors are shown a wide range of medieval tunnels and shafts from the final stages of when the mine was in operation.

Schauinsland Race 

Between 1923 and 1984, a legendary hillclimb race called the "ADAC Schauinsland-Rennen" took place on the Schauinslandstraße. Since 2000, this traditional motorsport event has taken place on a shortened route up to the Holzschägermatte, but only as a parade for classic cars. Since 1984, the Schauinslandstraße has been shut for motorcyclists between 1 April and 1 November, as well as at weekends and on public holidays.

Schauinslandkönig (Schauinsland King) 

Since 2007, there has been a hillclimb event on the L-124- "race course" from Horben to the chairlift station. It attracts over 1,000 participants a year, including racing cyclists, but also bikes with the capacity to tow children, tandem bikes, unicyclists, handicapped riders, inline skaters and roller skiers. They climb the so-called Schauinslandkönig (Schauinsland King) which is a distance of 11.5 km (7¼ miles) with a  climb.

Berghaus (Mountain House) 

In 1936, a hotel with 26 rooms and 74 beds was built on the mountain. This was used by the French Commandant from the end of the war to 1952. In 1958, it was used as a children's recreation centre and later as a halls of residence building for the town of Pforzheim. In 1989, it was used by the town of Freiburg as a home for refugees up until 1992 when it was used as a student halls of residence. A doctor from the Groddeck Hospital then tried to convert the building into a 48-bed rehabilitation centre, but this failed due to changes in health legislation and lack of credit. This led to its bankruptcy in late 2000. The building was empty from 2001 and the new doors and windows were vandalised. In 2011, the Berghaus was acquired by three couples from Freiburg, who wanted to convert the building into a conference centre and holiday home in the spring of 2015. They were supported in this endeavour by members of the Service Civil International. However, the project did not find enough support and the house is now due to be sold again.

Mountain hotel 

In 1869, the stage manager of the municipal theater in Freiburg built and ran a cottage to the south-west of the peak. After various changes, the guest house "Zur Friedrichsruhe" emerged, also known as "Berghotel Schauinsland" (mountain hotel Schauinsland). After a fire in 1926, the house was reconstructed to its current form. From 1936 to 1982, Heinrich Sauerer ran the mountain hotel together with his family. Afterwards, the workers' welfare union ran the guesthouse as a conference and meeting place for groups for thirteen years. As of 2006, the house, including 50 beds, can be fully rented. It is also the location of a detective novel.

Protected areas 

As of 12 December 2002, the Schauinsland's summit and the surrounding areas are protected by the regional council as a nature reserve (NSG number 3.264) within the natural environment of the High Black Forest. It is classified in the fourth IUCN category. The CDDA code is 319058. The nature reserve is supplemented by a conservation area of the same name, which has also been documented in the bylaw of December 2002. It incorporates the "Freiburger Bergwald" at the north-west slope of the Schauinsland, the "Kappler Tal" with a small and a big valley at the district of Kappel, the countryside south-west of "Brugge" and west of the L126 between "Kirchzarten-Bruckmühle" and the "Hohen Brücke" by St. Wilhelm, the countryside south-west of the "Trubelmattkopf" to the "Widener Eck" and east of the "Stampfbachtal" from "Oberneuhof" to "Spielweg" at the district of "Obermünstertal", as well as the meadows at the "Kohlerhöfen" in the district of "Ehrenstetten" within the nature reserve. Altogether, the landscape conservation area spans , of which  can be attributed to the urban district of Freiburg (under the number 3.11.008) and  can be attributed to the rural district Breisgau-High Black Forest (under the number 3.15.032).

Points of interest

Fallerhäusle 

The Fallerhäusle is a miner's house which is located about a kilometer (3000') below the visitors' entrance to the mine. It is a smaller version of the Schauinslandhaus. In the middle of the 18th century, there was great disagreement between the Hofsgrunder farmers and the mine owners concerning this miner's house. The mine owners had hired mountain experts/miners from Tyrol without taking care of housing possibilities for the men. Because of this, the Tyroleans were allowed to build their own small houses on the dumps and pits.

Wind beeches 

Due to its exposed location on the "Rheinebene" which the Schauinsland rises from, there is a lot of strong wind, mainly from the west. Over the course of many decades, this has led to unusual forms of the red beech trees growing there.

Schniederlihof 

Above "Hofsgrund" you can visit the Schniederlihof, a Black Forest farm house which was built in 1593. Schnieder is the Allemanic form of the name Schneider. Since the man was not a giant, Schneider became Schniederli (diminutive form). Until 1966, the farm was still managed and since 1972 it has been a local museum and can be visited from May to October.

Schauinslandbahn 

From Freiburg (valley station Horben), the Schauinsland can be reached by Germany's longest cable car. The 37 cabins can transport up to 700 people per hour, which is about 240,000 passengers per year. The Schauinslandbahn came into operation in 1930 as the world's first cable railway according to the circulation principle.

The lower station of the Schauinslandbahn can be reached by bus route 21 from the terminus of Freiburg city tram route 2 at Günterstal. All three lines are operated by VAG Freiburg, the city transport operator for Freiburg.

During the winter time, every couple of years, the Schauinsland cable car can be used as a ski lift when ideal snow conditions permit. About 300 metres (yards) from the carpark "Rotlache" and under the mountain station, the "cold water run" begins.

Schauinsland Tower 

Built in 1981, and named after the former Mayor of Freiburg Eugen Keidel, the lookout built on the summit of the Schauinsland is the start of many hiking routes within the local mountainous region.

The "Engländerdenkmal" (Englishmen Memorial) 

On 17 April 1936, a group of English students from the Strand School, along with their teacher Kenneth Keast, hiked up Schauinsland, attempting to reach Todtnauberg, a challenging hike even in favourable conditions. Severe weather had been predicted, and the group was inadequately equipped and clothed. It was already snowing when they left Freiburg, and despite several local people advising Keast not to walk on Schauinsland in such weather, they went on. Just short of the summit, they were engulfed in a blizzard, and severely lost. Hours later, part of the group finally made it to Hofsgrund, from where a search party immediately set off to rescue the scattered group from storm and darkness. Four of the group of 27 were already frozen to death or had died from exhaustion, and another one was very critical and died on the following day. This tragic event is locally known as the "Engländerunglück", literally "Englishmen’s calamity".

In 1938, in memory of this event, architect Hermann Alker from Karlsruhe erected a memorial for the deceased English students. This memorial, however, became a significant site for the Hitler Youth who used the monument for the purpose of propaganda.

After the Second World War, "Hitler Youth" in the inscription was replaced by "Youth of Germany", and the swastika and imperial eagle on the top bar were removed.

Eaton cross 
Jack Eaton, father of one of the deceased students, had a stone cross erected at the spot where his son, Jack Alexander Eaton, had been found lifeless. This cross is locally known as "Kleines Engländerdenkmal", literally "Little Memorial to the English". It bears a German inscription on the mountain side, and an equivalent English inscription on the valley side. Eaton intended to add the line, "Their teacher failed them in the hour of trial", but this was disallowed, as the official version of the event exonerated the teacher.

Observatories 

On the Schauinsland, there is a solar telescope, which is operated by the Kiepenheuer Institute for Solar Physics, which nowadays is only used for teaching and PR. Current research is mostly done at the Observatorio del Teide on Tenerife. The observatory can be visited without pre-booking on five open days between May and September, each of which is scheduled at the beginning of the year. On those days guided tours take place between 11:00 and 15:00.

The observatory was founded in 1943 by the German Luftwaffe of the Third Reich to make the most accurate prediction of the ideal frequency for military radio communication by observing the solar activities. It was managed by Karl-Otto Kiepenheuer from 1943 until 1975.

There is also an air measuring station on Schauinsland which belongs to the German environmental federal agency and the federal agency for radiation protection. The concentration of air pollutants is measured as part of the European Monitoring and Evaluation Program (EMEP), the climate-relevant gasses and radionuclides are recorded as part of the GAW. Both this building and the solar telescope were built in 1943 and were used to observe the quality of the ionosphere for the purpose of military radio communication.

A measuring station for the permanent monitoring of the artificial and natural radioactivity in the atmosphere has existed on the Schauinsland since 1957. It was integrated into the newly founded federal agency for radiation protection in 1989. Among other devices to measure traces of radioactivity in the air, the "Ortsdosisleistungs-Messnetz" and the supervision of the adherence to the Comprehensive Nuclear-Test-Ban Treaty (CTBT) takes place there.

Recreational activities 

The Schauinsland is a very popular leisure area for Freiburg and the region as it is suitable for a number of outdoor adventurous activities including hiking, skiing and mountain biking. In the winter, sledging is possible on the Holzschlägermatte or on the higher areas of the mountain where a sledge-lift operates. Cyclists can visit the Schauinsland for both challenging and leisurely trails and use the Schauinslandbahn to help them ascend the mountain. From May to November, it is possible to go down the mountain using a hired scooter, which takes about an hour. The area right below the top station is a popular starting position for paragliders.

Gallery

References

External links

  Information about and images
  Schauinsland
 Schauinsland Webcams
 Schauinsland Mine 

Mountains and hills of Baden-Württemberg
Mountains and hills of the Black Forest
One-thousanders of Germany